Umma declivium is a species of damselfly in the family Calopterygidae. It is found in Malawi and Tanzania. Its natural habitats are subtropical or tropical moist lowland forests and rivers. It is threatened by habitat loss.

References

Calopterygidae
Odonata of Africa
Insects described in 1906
Taxonomy articles created by Polbot